BDAV could mean:

 Blu-ray Disc Audio-Visual MPEG-2 Transport Stream or .m2ts
 Bandia virus, a strain of Qalyub orthonairovirus
 Building Designers Association of Victoria